Salvia albimaculata is a perennial shrub that is native to a very small region in Turkey, at 1200 m elevation in the Taurus Mountains. It is under 30 cm tall, and about 25–30 cm wide, with small greenish-gray evergreen leaves. The royal purple flowers, with a distinctive white patch on the lower lip, are about 2.5 cm long, in whorls of 2–5. The name, albimaculata, means 'spotted with white'.

Notes

albimaculata
Flora of Turkey